The 1987–88 Football League Cup (known as the Littlewoods Challenge Cup for sponsorship reasons) was the 28th season of the Football League Cup, a knockout competition for England's top 92 football clubs.

The competition began on 17 August 1987, and ended with the final on 24 April 1988. The final was played between Luton Town and holders Arsenal. The match, played at Wembley Stadium in front of 95,732 spectators, was won by Luton Town by 3–2.

First round

First leg

Second leg

Second round

First leg

Second leg

Third round

Replays

Fourth round
Bury v Manchester United was switched to Old Trafford.

Replay

Fifth Round

Semi-finals
Defending league champions Everton, still yet to win the League Cup, had their dreams of winning the trophy ended when they were well beaten over the two legs of the semi-final by holders Arsenal. In the other semi-final, 1986 winners Oxford United were ousted by Luton Town.

First leg

Second Leg

Final

References

General

Specific

EFL Cup seasons
1987–88 domestic association football cups
Lea
Cup